The 2018 Southeastern Conference men's basketball tournament was a postseason men's basketball tournament for the Southeastern Conference held at Scottrade Center, now known as Enterprise Center, in St. Louis, Missouri, from March 7 through March 11, 2018. Kentucky defeated Tennessee, 77–72, in the championship game to earn an automatic bid to the 2018 NCAA Division I men's basketball tournament.

Seeds

Schedule

Source:

Bracket

Game summaries

First round

Second round

Quarterfinals

Semifinals

Championship

References

2017–18 Southeastern Conference men's basketball season
SEC men's basketball tournament
SEC Men's Basketball
Basketball competitions in St. Louis
College sports tournaments in Missouri